Lovelyz8 is the first extended play by South Korean girl group Lovelyz. It was released on October 1, 2015. The EP contains seven tracks with the title track "Ah-Choo" and pre-release single "Shooting Star". This album marks the return of member Jisoo, who took a hiatus after becoming the target of online harassment.

This album is the last part of the 'Girls' trilogy. The sequel to their previous album Girls' Invasion and its repackage Hi~.

Background and release
On August 25, 2015, Woollim Entertainment announced Lovelyz would return with eight members, Jisoo rejoining the group, through a teaser image that included the "Lovelyz8" album logo.
The album was preceded with the release of its first single, "Shooting Star" on September 14 and the release of its music video on the same day. A preview of the album was released on September 28. A music video for the title track "Ah-Choo" was released on October 1 together with the digital album. Physical sales of the album began on October 2.  The group appeared on a live-streaming broadcast through the Naver V Live app called "Lovelyz Surprise Party." Promotions also began that day for "Ah-Choo" on Mnet's M! Countdown, followed by performances on 'KBS' Music Bank on October 2 and 'SBS' Inkigayo on October 4. That first week of promotion also included additional stages for either a shortened version of "How to be a Pretty Girl" or "Shooting Star."

Track listing

Charts

Album

Release history

References

External links
 
 

Lovelyz albums
2015 EPs
Korean-language EPs
Kakao M EPs
Woollim Entertainment EPs